Paul Russell Whalan (born 10 July 1941) is an Australian political lobbyist, former politician and member of the first Australian Capital Territory Legislative Assembly, representing Canberra for the Labor Party. Whalan was elected in 1989 and resigned from the Assembly on 30 April 1990. During his short term in the Assembly, Whalan served as the first Deputy Chief Minister and the first Minister with responsibilities for industry, employment and education in the first ACT Government led by Rosemary Follett.

Prior to entering politics, Whalan served as the ACT secretary of the Shop, Distributive and Allied Employees Association and as Senior Adviser to five Ministers in the Hawke Labor federal government. Whalan now runs his own political lobbying business in Canberra.

References

Deputy Chief Ministers of the Australian Capital Territory
Australian Labor Party members of the Australian Capital Territory Legislative Assembly
Members of the Australian Capital Territory Legislative Assembly
1941 births
Living people
Members of the Australian Capital Territory House of Assembly
Australian Labor Party members of the Australian Capital Territory House of Assembly